Gleneagles Hotel is a hotel near Auchterarder, Scotland. It was commissioned by the Caledonian Railway and opened in 1924. The bandleader, Henry Hall, performed at the hotel before the Second World War during which it served as a military hospital. There are three tournament-standard golf courses in the grounds and the hotel was redeveloped for the 40th Ryder Cup in 2014. Significant conferences at the hotel have included the Commonwealth Heads of Government Meeting 1977 and the 31st G8 summit in July 2005. It is a Category B listed building.

History
Construction of the hotel was commenced by the Caledonian Railway (CR), which also built the nearby Gleneagles railway station. However, by the time it opened in 1924, the CR had been absorbed by the London, Midland & Scottish Railway (LMS). It was equipped with its own dedicated railway branch line. An up-and-coming dance band leader named Henry Hall was involved in buying their pianos, and organising the dance band entertainment. He decided that radio broadcasts would be an ideal way to advertise the new hotel, so was given permission to move his Trafford Band from Manchester's Midland Hotel to the Gleneagles and form a new band in Manchester. The hotel's opening night was celebrated with Scotland's first ever outside broadcast on 7 June 1924.

After the season ended, the band moved to the Adelphi Hotel in Liverpool. Summer 1925 saw the band return to Gleneagles, although their commercial recordings were made in Manchester, and the winter seasons were in Liverpool.

During World War II, as with many large country hotels, it was converted into Gleneagles Hospital under the charge of Dr Thomas Ferguson as Medical Superintendent. In 1948 ownership of the hotel passed from LMS to the British Transport Commission and in 1963 to British Transport Hotels.

In 1980 the hotel was designated as a Category B listed building. In 1981, British Transport Hotels sold Gleneagles to a newly established private sector operator, Gleneagles Hotels plc. In 1984 it was acquired by Arthur Bell & Sons, which came into the ownership of Guinness in 1985 and Diageo in 1997.

Between 1982 and 1986, £11 million was spent on renovation and since 1982 the hotel has been open all year round. In 1986, and every year since, the hotel has been awarded five red stars by the AA. The hotel remained owned by Diageo, until it was sold to a private investment company Ennismore in 2015.

The hotel was redeveloped in preparation for hosting the 40th Ryder Cup in 2014 played on the PGA Centenary Course.

Facilities

Gleneagles has three golf courses: the King's Course, Queen's Course and PGA Centenary Course, previously known as the Monarch's Course. There is also a nine-hole course called the PGA National Academy Course, informally known as the Wee Course. Gleneagles Golf Academy opened in 1994 and in 2010 was re-branded to The PGA National Academy for Scotland. The Jack Nicklaus-designed PGA Centenary Course opened in 1993 and hosted the Ryder Cup in 2014. When asked about his work, Nicklaus said, "It's the finest parcel of land in the world I have ever been given to work with."

Tournaments that have taken place (or will take place) at Gleneagles include:

Glasgow Herald Tournament from 1920 to 1927
Curtis Cup in 1936
Women's British Open in 1957
Scottish Open from 1987 to 1994
McDonald's WPGA Championship of Europe from 1996 to 1999
Johnnie Walker Championship at Gleneagles from 1999 to 2013
40th Ryder Cup Matches in 2014
European Golf Team Championships in 2018
Solheim Cup and Junior Solheim Cup in 2019
Senior Open Championship in 2022

The British School of Falconry has been located at Gleneagles since 1992.

The village of Glenmor has holiday homes set within the grounds of the hotel.

Conferences

Conferences have included:
Gleneagles Agreement on sporting contacts with South Africa at the Commonwealth Heads of Government Meeting 1977.
The 1986 meeting (25–27 April) of the Bilderberg Group.
31st G8 summit in July 2005. This meeting saw the foundation of the G8+5.

Awards
Gleneagles Hotel has won/holds various awards, including:

 5 Red AA Stars (since 1986)
 Conde Nast Gold List 2009 – Best Hotel in the World for Facilities
 Scotland's leading resort at the World Travel Awards 2008
 Best Golf Resort in the World (2012, 2013, 2014, 2015, 2016 and 2017) – Ultratravel Magazine
 Scotland's Best Hotel – Today's Golfer Travel Awards (2014, 2015, 2016 and 2017)

See also
 Golf in Scotland
 Gleneagles, Scotland
 List of G8 summit resorts
 Emergency Hospital Service

References

External links

Auchterarder
Hotels in Perth and Kinross
Caledonian Railway
Category B listed buildings in Perth and Kinross
Curtis Cup venues
Diageo
Golf clubs and courses in Perth and Kinross
Gleneagles
Hotel buildings completed in 1924
Listed hotels in Scotland
Inventory of Gardens and Designed Landscapes
London, Midland and Scottish Railway
Railway hotels in Scotland
Ryder Cup venues
Solheim Cup venues
Sports venues in Perth and Kinross
1924 establishments in Scotland
2018 European Championships venues
Five star hotels